Below is a list of women's artistic gymnastics events held in 2015, as well as the medalists.

Calendar of events

International Medalists (WAG)

Major Competitions

International Championships

Multi-sport Games

Continental Championships

World Cup Series

National Championships
Note: Although England, Scotland, and Wales are listed as individual countries in the table below, gymnasts from these countries compete under the flag of Great Britain at all major international competitions, except for the Commonwealth Games.

Season's best scores
Only the scores of senior gymnasts from international events have been included below; one score per gymnast.

Women's All-Around

Women's Vault

Women's Uneven Bars

Women's Balance Beam

Women's Floor Exercise

References 

Gymnastics by year
Artistic gymnastics